BioAnalyt (BioAnalyt GmbH) is a privately held product-innovation company based in Teltow, Germany. The company focuses on developing, manufacturing, and marketing portable rapid test kits. Being sold under the name iCheck, the kits measure the concentration of vitamin A, total carotenoids, iron, or iodine in food and biological fluids. The test kits are easy to use, provide quantitative results within several minutes time. Displaying an innovative alternative to the established laboratory methods. In addition to products, BioAnalyt provides a broad spectrum of services connected with control of food quality or food fortification; which analyses of large-scale coverage studies in developing countries.

History 

BioAnalyt was founded in 1999 by Professor Dr. Florian J. Schweigert, head of the Department of Nutrition at the University of Potsdam and internationally recognized scientist with more than 200 scientific publications. Schweigert developed and is the patent holder of the test kit technology, the roots of which go back to  several decades of research work, in the field of fat-soluble vitamins and nutritional biomarkers. BioAnalyt has developed a patented test kit, consisting of a portable measuring instrument and specially designed reagent vials which enable a valid proof of the nutritional content in food and nutrient supply of people within a few minutes. Once started as a  team of two, currently BioAnalyt has over 20 employees. It successfully sells its products to more than 80 countries.

Business focus 
 Food Quality: Food producers monitor the amount of vitamins and minerals in the foods during the production process. iCheck test kits give the power to carry out the monitoring by decreasing cost and saving time.
 Human Health: Widespread throughout the world, micronutrient deficiencies have detrimental effects on the health of populations and are the subject of global health interventions. BioAnalyt's test kits can be used to measure the key micronutrients (for example, Vitamin A, iron and iodine) and enable the monitoring of the progress of these interventions.
 Animal Health: Fertility problems due to a deficiency in beta-carotene is one of the most costly production diseases in dairy farming today. iCheck test kits for vitamin A and beta-carotene can be used to assess the nutritional status in cattle within a few minutes in the field.
 Research: Enriching plants with vitamins and minerals through selection and breeding, known as bio-fortification, is a focus of research institutions worldwide. For example, the International Institute of Tropical Agriculture (IITA) is working on breeding of vitamin A rich cassava roots. iCheck test kits are used to carry out the monitoring by decreasing cost and saving time. Research institutes and labs use the test kits as high-throughput analysis equipment to assess data on nutrients within a short period of time.

Public Private Partnerships 

BioAnalyt partners with various NGOs such as Global Alliance for Improved Nutrition (GAIN) , Helen Keller International (HKI), GIZ, Iodine Global Network (IGN), and leading vitamin producers such as BASF and DSM to improve access to nutritious foods in areas with high rates of malnutrition by providing efficient tools for program monitoring and quality control.

Patents 

BioAnalyt's founder and managing director Prof. Dr. Florian J. Schweigert is a holder of 3 national and international patents for the technology the companies products are based.:
Determination of biological material ingredients
Patent number: 8501430
METHOD FOR THE EXTRACTION AND DETECTION OF FAT-SOLUBLE COMPONENTS FROM BIOLOGICAL MATERIALS
Application number: 20120156794
Determination of biological material ingredients
Application number: 20110256566

Products 
BioAnalyt's product focus is portable analytical solutions for fat-soluble vitamins as well as microelements including iron, iodine and zinc:
 iCheck Fluoro - portable fluorometer for vitamin A analysis in milk, food, premix, and biological liquids, like breast milk.
 iCheck Chroma - portable photometer to measure vitamin A quantitatively in edible oils and plant fats. 
 iCheck Carotene - portable photometer for total carotenoid analysis in beverages, food, vitamin premixes and biological liquids. Among others it can be used for the measurement of total carotenoids in cassava to select pro-vitamin A rich varieties.
 iCheck Iodine - portable photometer for iodine analysis in salt. 
 iCheck Iron - portable photometer to measure added and instrinsic iron in foods and premixes.
 iCheck Zinc - portable photometer to measure Zinc in wheat flour and premix. It was developed in cooperation with BASF & Teck.

Awards
In the recent years BioAnalyt received the following prizes:

2015 - Deloitte Technology Fast 50 Award (Germany)

2015 - BITC Unilever Global Development Award, Finalist (Globally)

2014 - Deloitte Technology Fast 50 Award (Germany)

2014 - Top 100 Award, Category Innovation (Germany)

2014 - Innovationspreis Brandenburg – prize winner in the category “food industry” (Germany)

2008 - Innov’Space (France)

2007 - Techologietransferpreis Berlin-Brandenburg (Germany)

Further reading
In January 2015, BioAnalyt was  featured in the innovative German business magazine Brand eins with an article on the topic of "self-determination". BioAnalyt products were also mentioned in following publications:
 Comparative Validation of Five Quantitative Rapid Test Kits for the Analysis of Salt Iodine Content: Laboratory Performance, User- and Field-Friendliness. Authors: Rohner F, Kangambèga M, Khan N. PLoS One, 2015
 Assessment of a portable device to quantify vitamin A in fortified foods (flour, sugar, and milk) for quality control. Authors: Laillou A, Renaud C, Berger J, Moench-Pfanner R, Fontan L, Avallone S. - Food Nutr Bull. 2014 Dec;35(4):449-57.
 Comparison of breast milk vitamin A concentration measured in fresh milk by a rapid field assay (the iCheck FLUORO) with standard measurement of stored milk by HPLC. Authors:  R Engle-Stone, MJ Haskell, MR La Frano, AO Ndjebayi, M Nankap and KH Brown. - European Journal of Clinical Nutrition (2014), 1–3
 Validation of a user-friendly and rapid method for quantifying iodine content of salt. Authors: F. Rohner, G. S. Garrett, A. Laillou, S. K. Frey, R. Mothes, F. J. Schweigert, and L. Locatelli-Rossi. - Food and Nutrition Bulletin, vol. 33, no. 4 (supplement) © 2012, The United Nations University Press
 Retinol Assessment Among Women and Children in Sahelian Mobile Pastoralists. Authors: M. Bechir, E. Schelling, K. Kraemer, F. Schweigert, B. Bonfoh, L. Crump, M. Tanner, and J. Zinsstag - EcoHealth 9, 113–121, 2012
 Quantification of Vitamin A in Palm Oil Using a Fast and Simple Portable Device: Method Validation and Comparison to High-Performance Liquid Chromatograph. Authors: F. Rohner, S. K. Frey, R. Mothes, A.Hurtienne, S. Hartong, P. Emery Bosso, M. Bui, Florian J. Schweigert, and C. Northrop-Clewes. -  Int. J. Vitam. Nutr. Res. 81 (5) © 2011 Hans Huber Publishers, Hogrefe AG, Bern
 A New Test Kit's Potential for the Rapid Analysis of Vitamin A in Human and Cow Milk. Authors: O. Dary, P. Juarez, S. K. Frey, R. Mothers, F. J. Schweigert. - Sight and Life Magazine 25(3) 2011.
 Determination of β-carotene in whole blood of cattle: Comparison of a new cow-side assay with HPLC. Authors:  J. Raila, F. Enjalbert, R. Mothes, A. Hurtienne, F. J Schweigert. - Veterinary Clinical Pathology 2011

References

External links 
BioAnalyt website

1999 establishments in Germany
Innovation organizations
Companies based in Brandenburg
Privately held companies of Germany